Eucalyptus retinens, commonly known as Hillgrove box, is a species of tree that is endemic to the Northern Tablelands of New South Wales. It has rough, fibrous or flaky bark on the trunk and larger branches, smooth bark on the thinner branches, lance-shaped adult leaves, flower buds in groups of seven, white flowers and cup-shaped, cylindrical or hemispherical fruit.

Description
The bark on the trunk and larger branches is rough, fibrous or flaky and grey and the bark on the thinner branches is grey to greenish.

Taxonomy and naming
Eucalyptus retinens was first formally described in 1990 by Lawrie Johnson and Ken Hill in the journal Telopea from material collected north of Ebor in 1954. The specific epithet (retinens) is a Latin word meaning "retaining", referring to the persistent bark of this species.

Distribution and habitat
Hillgrove box grows at the edge of steep gorges or on the top of steep ridges on the eastern parts of the Northern Tablelands.

References

retinens
Myrtales of Australia
Flora of New South Wales
Trees of Australia
Plants described in 1990